Fahed Adnan Foad Abdul Attal (born 1 January 1985) is a Palestinian former professional footballer who played as a striker. He is the all-time top goalscorer of the Palestine national team with 14 official goals and 16 in all competitions.

Club career

Move to Jordanian Premier League
After grabbing the attention of scouts of clubs such as Al-Wahdat with a dazzling performance at the 2006 AFC Challenge Cup Attal agreed a loan deal with Al-Jazeera of the Jordan League. After scoring 8 goals in his inaugural season, Attal was transferred on a permanent deal worth $21000 USD. In 2010, he signed a one-year $50,000 contract to join Al-Wahdat Attal would play an important role in the team winning a historic quadruple but with the signing of Abdullah Deeb, Attal chose to search for a new club. He signed a one-year contract with Hebron-based Shabab Al-Khaleel of the West Bank Premier League.

International career
Attal is the all-time top goalscorer of the Palestine national team, with 14 goals in 39 games. Twelve of Attal's goals with the national team came in the 2006 calendar year earning him recognition from International Federation of Football History and Statistics which cited Attal as the World's 8th leading scorer of international goals on par with the likes of David Villa and Bastian Schweinsteiger. Attal was also included in the Asian Football Confederation shortlist of 10 players for the 2006 AFC Player of the Year Award Palestine had an undefeated record when Attal found the back of the net. This was until he scored against the Philippines in the 2012 AFC Challenge Cup where they lost 4–3.

Career statistics

International
Scores and results list Palestine's goal tally first.

Unofficial

Honours

Club
Al-Wehdat 
Jordan League: Winner: 2010–11
Jordan FA Cup: Winner: 2010–11
Jordan FA Shield: Winner: 2010
Jordan Super Cup: Winner: 2011

Individual
AFC Challenge Cup Golden Boot: 2006

References

External links

Goal.com profile 

1985 births
Living people
People from Qalqilya
Palestinian footballers
Al-Wehdat SC players
Shabab Al-Khalil SC players
West Bank Premier League players
Palestine international footballers
Palestinian expatriate footballers
Expatriate footballers in Jordan
Palestinian expatriate sportspeople in Jordan
Association football forwards
Footballers at the 2006 Asian Games
Asian Games competitors for Palestine